Calligra Words is a word processor, which is part of Calligra Suite and developed by KDE as free software.

History 

When the Calligra Suite was formed, unlike the other Calligra applications Words was not a continuation of the corresponding KOffice application – KWord. The Words was largely written from scratch – in May 2011 a completely new layout engine was announced.

Reception 
Initial reception of Calligra Words shortly after the 2.4 release was mixed. While Linux Pro Magazine Online's Bruce Byfield wrote “Calligra needed an impressive first release. Perhaps surprisingly, and to the development team’s credit, it has managed one in 2.4.”, he also noted that “Words in particular is still lacking features”. He concluded that Calligra is “worth keeping an eye on”.

On the other hand, Calligra Words became the default word processor in Kubuntu 12.04 – replacing LibreOffice Writer.

Formula editor 
Formulas in Calligra Words are provided by the Formula plugin. It is a formula editor with a WYSIWYG interface.

See also 

 List of word processors
 Comparison of word processors

References

W
Free word processors
Linux word processors

de:Calligra Suite#Textverarbeitung
es:Calligra Suite#KWord